141st meridian may refer to:

141st meridian east, a line of longitude east of the Greenwich Meridian
141st meridian west, a line of longitude west of the Greenwich Meridian